Francis Crawford may refer to:

Francis Chalmers Crawford (1851–1908), Scottish stockbroker and amateur ornithologist
Francis Marion Crawford (1854–1909), American novelist
Francis Crawford of Lymond, fictional central figure of The Lymond Chronicles book series by Dorothy Dunnett